Paria Farzaneh is an English-born Iranian fashion designer. She is based in London.

Career
Paria Farzaneh earned her degree in fashion design from London's Ravensbourne University in 2016. Since then, she has established herself among the main London-based female designers of men's wear. Farzaneh has notably created designs for the likes of Converse, Gore-Tex, LeBron James and Nick Young. Farzaneh grew up in North Ferriby, East Yorkshire; her grandfather was a tailor in Iran and her parents emigrated from Iran before she was born, helping to influence her use of Persian art and language in her designs that led way to her signature patterned cotton textiles from Isfahan. Farzaneh launched her label in 2017 and has staged fashion shows each season.

References

English fashion designers
British women fashion designers
Iranian fashion designers
Fashion designers from London
Iranian women fashion designers
English people of Iranian descent
Living people
Year of birth missing (living people)

Iranian textile artists